Lamidorcadion tuberosum is a species of beetle in the family Cerambycidae. It was described by Holzschuh in 1993.

References

Morimopsini
Beetles described in 1993